The British Columbia Social Credit Party was a conservative political party in the Province of British Columbia, Canada.  The provincial Social Credit movement was divided in its early years and was largely under the influence of the Alberta Social Credit League and did not have a functional leadership before 1952.

The 1952 leadership convention was held when the party was largely dominated by the Alberta leadership of the national social credit movement. Alberta Premier Ernest Manning hand-picked Ernest George Hansell to lead the British Columbia party into the election despite the fact that Hansell was an Alberta politician. W.A.C. Bennett was chosen party leader by Social Credit MLAs following the election.

In 1973, the party elected W.A.C. Bennett's son, Bill Bennett, on the first ballot.

All of the party's leadership conventions before 1993 were delegated, i.e., local party riding associations selected delegates to attend a convention and elect a leader by secret ballot.

The 1993 leadership election was determined by a "one-member, one-vote" system, using mail-in preferential ballots. The 1994 leadership election used the same system, but did not incorporate preferential balloting as there were only two candidates.

1952 leadership convention
Held April 27, 1952
Reverend Ernest George Hansell acclaimed
W.A.C. Bennett (declined nomination)
Lyle Wicks (declined nomination)

At this time the Alberta Social Credit League still dominated the British Columbia association. Hansell, an Alberta Social Credit Member of Parliament, was the hand-picked candidate of Alberta Premier Ernest Manning. Bennett and Wicks were both nominated from the floor, however, but declined allowing Hansell to be acclaimed. Following the general election in which Social Credit unexpectedly emerged as the largest party, Wicks, who was the British Columbia party's president, called a new leadership vote at which only elected Social Credit MLAs could vote. In this contest, held on July 15, 1952, Bennett defeated Philip Gaglardi by a margin of 10 to 9 to become Social Credit leader and was invited by the lieutenant-governor to become Premier of the province.

1973 leadership convention

(Held on November 24, 1973.)

First Ballot:

William R. Bennett  833
Bob McClelland  269
Harvey Schroeder 204
James Chabot 97
Ed Smith 74
James Mason 10

1986 leadership convention

(Held on July 29–30, 1986.)

First Ballot:

Bill Vander Zalm 367
Grace McCarthy 244
Bud Smith 202
Brian Smith 196
Jim Nielsen 54
John Reynolds 54
Stephen Rogers 43
Bob Wenman 40
Cliff Michael 32
Bill Ritchie 28
Mel Couvelier 20
Kim Campbell 14

Second Ballot (Campbell eliminated, five others withdraw):

Bill Vander Zalm 457
Grace McCarthy 280
Brian Smith 255
Bud Smith 219
John Reynolds 39
Jim Nielsen 30

Third Ballot (Nielsen eliminated, Reynolds and Bud Smith withdraw):

Bill Vander Zalm 625
Brian Smith 342
Grace McCarthy 305

Fourth Ballot (McCarthy eliminated):

Bill Vander Zalm 801
Brian Smith 454

1991 interim leadership

On April 2, 1991, Rita Johnston was elected by the party's MLAs as their interim leader, defeating Russell Fraser by 21 votes to 17 on the fourth ballot. Claude Richmond, Norm Jacobsen and Mel Couvelier had previously been eliminated.

1991 leadership convention

(Held on July 20, 1991.)

First Ballot:

Grace McCarthy 659
Rita Johnston 652
Mel Couvelier 331
Norm Jacobsen 169
Duane Crandell 35

Second Ballot (Couvelier supports Johnston):

Rita Johnston 941
Grace McCarthy 881

1993 leadership election

(Held on November 6, 1993.)

First Ballot:

Grace McCarthy 7,338
Graham Bruce 5,321
Claude Richmond 2,083
Jim Turner 91

Second Ballot:

Grace McCarthy 7,351
Graham Bruce 5,352
Claude Richmond 2,099

Third Ballot:

Grace McCarthy 7,700
Graham Bruce 6,245

1994 leadership election

(Announced on November 4, 1994.)

First Ballot:

Larry Gillanders 1,034
John Caleb 787

References

Social Credit Party Leadership
Social credit parties in Canada
Social Credit